Naaigal Jaakirathai is a 2014 Indian Tamil-language comedy thriller film written and directed by Shakti Soundar Rajan featuring Sibiraj, Arundhati  and a German Shepherd dog named Mani in the lead. It is inspired from the 1989 film Turner & Hooch. The film was produced by Sibiraj's father Sathyaraj under the banner Nathambal Film Factory. The music was composed by Dharan Kumar, cinematography was handled by Nizar Shifi and edited by Praveen K. L.

Naaigal Jaakirathai was released on 21 November 2014 and received positive reviews from critics and audience, and was one of the most profitable ventures of 2014. The movie was dubbed in Hindi as Police Aur Tiger.

Plot
A gang has kidnapped a girl and several police officers, including Karthik (Sibiraj), who is attempting to rescue her. During a shootout, one man from the gang and a police officer named Arul Das (Raghav Umasrinivasan), who is a good friend of Karthik, are killed, while Karthik gets injured. He is put out of action and suffers from posttraumatic stress disorder.

Subramani (Idoh) is a trained military dog who has the potential to nab culprits and decipher crime scenes. After its owner, an army officer, is shot dead, Subramani is returned to the officer's father in Coimbatore, who is a neighbor of Karthik. The neighbor leaves the town and requests Karthik to provide shelter to Subramani during his absence. Karthik denies the request but provides shelter after seeing Subramani being troubled by the small kids in the neighborhood. Karthik learns about Subramani and becomes good friends with him.

Meanwhile, Karthik's wife Renuka (Arundhati) is abducted by Anbu Das (Balaji Venugopal), the head of the kidnapping ring, and is buried alive inside a coffin. A web camera is attached into the coffin, and the live stream is provided to Karthik. Karthik learns that Renuka can breathe for about six hours. Renuka speaks to Anbu, and with the help of a deaf and dumb teacher, Karthik deciphers what Renuka had conveyed. Suddenly, water trickles into the coffin, and Karthik concludes that it has to be rainwater. He, Subramani, and his cop friend travel to Ooty, the only place in Tamil Nadu where it was raining at the moment.

Anbu had kidnapped Renuka to avenge the death of his brother, who was not the man from his gang, but Arul, who worked as a mole in the police department. Karthik is then hit by a metal rod and is also buried in a coffin. Subramani sniffs out Anbu and his henchmen. While Anbu can escape to a tree house, his henchmen get bitten by Subramani, who saves Karthik by digging a pit. Anbu gets hold of a gun and shoots at Subramani, injuring him fatally, before Karthik manages to outwit and defeat Anbu in a fight. Before dying, Subramani had marked the place where Renuka is buried, and Karthik saved her, while Anbu has been buried alive in the same manner.

Subramani has gotten offspring, and Karthik is given one of the puppies. The movie ends with a scene where Karthik and his new dog, who has been named Chinnamani in Subramani's memory, are being entrusted with investigating a new case.

Cast 

 Sibiraj as Inspector Karthik  Chinnamalai
 Arundhati as Renuka
 Idoh (Dog) as Subramani
 Balaji Venugopal as Anbu Das
 Manobala as Pichumani
 Mayilsamy as Dog Owner
 Prinz Nithik as Arunachalam
 Venkat Sundar as Appu
 Raghav Umasrinivasan as Arul Das
 Maheswaran Muthusamy as Rajesh
 Abimanyu Nallamuthu as Selvam
 Varsha as Vidya
 Aroul D. Shankar

Production 
After Naanayam, Sibi Sathyaraj was on the lookout for a script for his next film. Since nothing interesting turned up, he took a brief hiatus, still reading scripts. Sibiraj is a dog-lover and has 3 dogs. So, he expressed his eagerness in working with animals in a film. Director Shakti S. Rajan, who had earlier directed Sibiraj in Naanayam, came up with a script with a dog in the lead. The film is about a military-trained dog and a man, and their journey. Finally, the film was announced in July 2013. The film was titled Naaigal Jaakirathai meaning 'Beware of Dogs'.

Sibiraj plays the second hero and will be sharing screen space with a military trained canine. Apart from playing the hero, the dog would also do several action sequences and comedy tracks in the film. Arundhati of Sundaattam fame was signed as the female lead.

The crew was on the lookout for a trained dog, preferably a German Shepherd. After a search, they found a dog from Bangalore. Filming began on 9 October 2013. The story takes place in Coimbatore, and travels to Ooty, Palakkad and Chennai.

Soundtrack 

The soundtrack album was composed by Dharan Kumar while the lyrics were written by Yugabharathi and Madhan Karky. A single track "Doggy Style" was released on 27 August 2014. The album was launched at the Radio Mirchi FM Station, Chennai on 1 September 2014, where the cast and crew were present at the event.

Behindwoods gave 2.75 out of 5 stars to the album stating it as "a waggy and naughty album from Dharan." Milliblog stated "Dharan hasn’t been in the best of forms recently and Naaigal Jaakirathai’s soundtrack is no exception." Behindframes gave 3 out of 5 and stated "Cool, peppy and enjoyable tracks by Dharan."

Release 
The satellite rights of the film were sold to Sun TV.

Reception

Critical reception
The film received generally positive reviews. The Times of India gave the film 3.5 stars out of 5 and wrote, "Naaigal Jaakirathai'''s success lies in how cannily Soundar Rajan gives us a thriller that also feels light. But there is a bit of spoon-feeding in the form of exposition that is necessary but sticks out on screen because of how it is presented". Rediff gave 2.5 stars out of 5 and wrote, "Whatever its faults, director Shakti Soundar Rajan's Naaigal Jaakirathai is a decent fun-filled entertainer". The New Indian Express wrote, "The uncomplicated tale of a man and his dog may have its glitches. But it’s refreshing in its premise and has many charming moments". Filmibeat rated 3 out of 5 and stated "Naaigal Jaakirathai is an amazingly new attempt as you don't get to see a dog in the lead very often in Indian cinemas. Kudos to Sibiraj who has played a second protagonist while the dog gets the central character as the story demands for it. Watch the movie for Idoh, the Belgian Shepherd and its splendid performance and of course for Sibiraj who has done justice to his character by portraying a neat and a sturdy looking cop".

The Hindu wrote, "You wouldn’t perhaps begrudge the makers their ‘influences’ if the result was a film we generally don't see a lot of, but Naaigal reneges on the promise of its first portions". Sify stated "Naaigal Jaakirathai is a film where the idea sounds good but falls short in execution. Shakti Soundar Rajan’s idea of making an investigation thriller along with the fun elements of a dog is laudable but what lacks in the film is detailing of characters". Behindwoods rated 2.75 out of 5 and stated "Giving so much importance to a dog over the hero, logical screenplay, duration of the film and a engaging climax are the positives of Naaigal Jaakirathai. This is arguably the only authentic dog based film after the well known Rama Narayan directed stories that had animals playing vital roles".

Box office
On 8 December 2014, Sreedhar Pillai from Sify reported that the film, made on a budget of  4 crores, had grossed  7.25 crores till then. Furthermore, the satellite rights were sold for  2.5 crores, making it a profitable venture for its producers.

Sequel
After the film became a commercial success, Shakti Soundar Rajan informed that he had plans to make a sequel to Naaigal Jaakirathai''. It would feature Sibiraj and the dog, as well as the lead characters from the first part, and is scheduled to commence in 2020.

References

External links
 

2014 films
Films about dogs
2010s Tamil-language films
Indian detective films
Films about human trafficking in India
Police detective films
Indian comedy thriller films
2014 action thriller films
Films scored by Dharan Kumar